József Tasnádi (10 October 1903 – 1 October 1977) was a Hungarian wrestler. He competed in the Greco-Roman bantamweight at the 1924 Summer Olympics. Four years later, he won a gold medal at the 1930 European Wrestling Championships.

References

External links
 

1903 births
1977 deaths
Olympic wrestlers of Hungary
Wrestlers at the 1924 Summer Olympics
Hungarian male sport wrestlers